Falls Music & Arts Festival (commonly known as Falls) is a multi-day music festival held annually in Byron Bay (New South Wales) and Fremantle (Western Australia), Australia over the New Year's Eve and January period.  The festival hosts contemporary music performances, dance, comedy, theatre, circus, cabaret, and other art forms. Camping is available and all locations have nearby beaches which are either walking distance or a short bus ride away. 
Artists playing at the festival include rock, hip hop, indie music, electronic music, blues and roots.

The Festival was previously held in Lorne, Victoria from its inception until 2018, Marion Bay, Tasmania between 2003 and 2019  and Melbourne, Victoria in 2022.

The Falls festival in Byron Bay features a rave party hidden behind a washing machine in a laundromat.

History

The festival started in 1993, with a small one-day concert, held in Lorne, Victoria, Australia, and was named Rock Above The Falls. The initial event attracted nearly 11,000 people, exceeding the organisers' expectations, and the organisers negotiated the use of neighbouring land to accommodate the crowd.

In 1995, the event adopted a two-day format, and in 1996 the name was changed to The Falls Music & Arts Festival.  The 1999 festival was the first to be held off the Lorne site, moved temporarily to the Torquay site of the Offshore Festival due to poor weather.

Two events were held simultaneously for the first time in 2003; one in Lorne, and an additional event at Marion Bay, Tasmania.  The same acts played at both events; the 30 December acts who played at Lorne, play 31 December at Marion Bay, and vice versa. Both the Lorne and Marion Bay festivals have continued to run simultaneously and artists continue to be exchanged between the two locations over the course of the festival. Subsequent festivals retained this two-location format.

The Byron edition of the event was introduced in 2013, increasing the reach of the festival across the country. 

In 2019, the festival at the Lorne site was cancelled due to extreme bushfire risk during the 2019–20 Australian bushfire season. All editions of the festivals in 2020 and 2021 were cancelled due to the COVID-19 pandemic in Australia, with organisers citing interstate travel restrictions. 

In 2021, the Marion Bay edition of the festival was cancelled permanently, with organisers citing low revenue from the event. In March 2023, Secret Sounds, the organisers of the festivals, placed the 273 hectare Marion Bay property that hosted the Tasmanian festival on the market, to be sold under expressions of interest.

In 2022, the Victorian edition of the festival was held at the Sidney Myer Music Bowl in inner city Melbourne, after originally being planned for the town of Murroon, located 35 km from Lorne. Organisers of the Festival pulled out of the planning process after a small local group opposed the planning permit approval.

Awards
In 2008, the Falls Festival won the FasterLouder Festival Award for 'Best Lineup' and the following year the Marion Bay site received the 'Favourite Venue and Location' award.

The festival has a strong focus on sustainability, taking home the following awards over the past few years:
Winner – Excellence in Sustainability Victorian Tourism Awards 2012
Winner – Excellence in Sustainability Victorian Tourism Awards 2013
Winner – Excellence in Sustainability Victorian Tourism Awards 2014 (inducted into the Hall of Fame)
Outstanding in the Greener Festival Awards 2012
Outstanding in the Greener Festival Awards 2013
Outstanding in the Greener Festival Awards 2014
Winner – Major Festivals & Events Tasmanian Tourism Awards 2013
Winner – Major Festivals & Events Tasmanian Tourism Awards 2014
Winner – Major Festival Australian Event Awards 2014

Awards and nominations

National Live Music Awards
The National Live Music Awards (NLMAs) are a broad recognition of Australia's diverse live industry, celebrating the success of the Australian live scene. The awards commenced in 2016.

|-
| National Live Music Awards of 2016
| Falls Festival
| Best Live Music Festival or Event
| 
|-
| National Live Music Awards of 2018
| Falls Festival
| Best Live Music Festival or Event
| 
|-
| rowspan="2" | National Live Music Awards of 2019
| rowspan="2"| Falls Festival
| Victorian Live Event of the Year
| 
|-
| Tasmanian All Ages Achievement
| 
|-

Timeline

1996

Pennywise
Radio Birdman
Regurgitator
Custard
Powderfinger
The Living End
Even
Dave Graney and the Coral Snakes
Sidewinder
Pollyanna
Bodyjar
Snout
Moler
Rebecca's Empire
Meantime

1997

Iggy Pop
You Am I
The Cruel Sea
Hard Ons
Lagwagon
Superjesus
Jebediah
Shihad
Grinspoon
Guttermouth
The Living End
Even
Something For Kate
Deadstar
Front End Loader
Pre Shrunk
Sprung Monkey
Liberty (Triple J Unearthed Winners "Porcelein")

1998

Blondie
Mudhoney
Bentley Rhythm Ace
Rocket From The Crypt
Unwritten Law
Area-7
The Avalanches
Magic Dirt
Moler
You Am I
Grinspoon
Superjesus
Nancy Vandal
Ammonia
Screamfeeder
Even
Bodyjar
Something For Kate
Frenzal Rhomb
Violetine
Voitek
Honeysmack
Pound System

1999

Violent Femmes
The Tea Party
Freddy Fresh
Regurgitator
Something For Kate
You Am I
Frenzal Rhomb
Superheist
Killing Heidi
DJ Boppa
28 Days
Alex Lloyd
Area-7
Rhubarb
Pollyanna
The Fauves

2000

Silverchair
Reef
The Vandals
Freestylers
Killing Heidi
Superjesus
The Avalanches
Magic Dirt
Bodyjar
Groove Terminator
John Butler Trio
Skulker
Pre Shrunk
Sunk Loto
78 Saab
Superheist
Rocket Science
Dallas Crane
Nokturnl
Nitocris
The Waifs
George
Machine Gun Fellatio
Resin Dogs
Friendly (musician)
Josh Abrahams
1200 Techniques
Honeysmack
Voitek

2001

The Hives
Stanton Warriors
Grinspoon
Regurgitator
John Butler Trio
Something For Kate
28 Days
Resin Dogs
Groove Terminator
Alex Lloyd
Paul Kelly
Bodyjar
Dr. Alex Paterson
George
Superheist
Area-7
One Dollar Short
1200 Techniques
Dern Rutlidge
Warped
NuBreed
On Inc
Pound System
Blueline Medic
For Amusement Only

2002

Jack Johnson
The Black Eyed Peas
Ozomatli
Timo Maas
The Vandals
The Ataris
Brad
Grinspoon
Machine Gun Fellatio
Infusion
Xavier Rudd
1200 Techniques
The Casanovas
You Am I
Magic Dirt
Jet
Rocket Science
The Drones
Underside
Antiskeptic
The Gels
The Butterfly Effect
Groove Terminator
Offcutts
Warped
Pete Murray
Even
Melatonin
The Beautiful Girls
The Sleepy Jackson
Phil Smart
Goodwill
Samuel Jackson
The Alias
Ballpoint
Three Rounds Shy (JJJ Unearthed)
Ransom
Quirk

2003

Michael Franti and Spearhead
Rollins Band
Groove Armada
Pennywise
Reel Big Fish
G. Love and Special Sauce
Turin Brakes
Ozomatli
Mason Jennings
Paul Kelly
The Waifs
Xavier Rudd
Regurgitator
The Beautiful Girls
Cog
The Mess Hall
Trey
Bodyjar
Dallas Crane
Dexter
Bit By Bats
Nubreed
Krafty Kuts
Cut Copy
Missy Higgins
TZU
James De La Cruz
Offcuts
Danny Kelly and the Alpha Males
The Butterfly Effect
After The Fall
Degrees K
The Pictures
Riff Random
Ember Swift
Bomba
Gerling
Harry Manx
Flagrant and Ben Shepard
John Course and Goodwill
Bugdust
Epicure
The Swedish Styles
Carus
Whalebone
The Charlie Parkers
Damon
The Go Set
The Double Agents
Mick Hart
SMC
Unleash The Nugget
Reflex
Waiter
Peter Cornelius and the Devilles
The Fat Band
Enola Fall
Taiko Drum
S. Jackson and Somantik
Sharif Galal
DJ Selekt and B Dub

Performers at the 2003-04 event include Australian artists Xavier Rudd, The Beautiful Girls, Gerling, Regurgitator and The Waifs; and international acts Michael Franti and Spearhead, Pennywise, Reel Big Fish, and Ozomatli.  Like many Australian festivals, the event also promotes local bands, with Victorian and Tasmanian artists also performing at their respective state's festival.  Solo female performer Missy Higgins promoted the release of her album and several singles, for which she was later recognised by receiving multiple awards at the ARIA Awards in 2005.

2004

The 2004/05 festival was again held at both venues. Both sites sold out early – the only Falls Festival to sell as fast was the 1999 event.  Artists performing at the event included:

The Black Keys
De La Soul
Billy Bragg
The Living End
The John Butler Trio
Missy Higgins
The Thrills
Veruca Salt
Spiderbait
The Cat Empire
Xavier Rudd
Donavon Frankenreiter
You Am I
The Beautiful Girls
Vusi Mahlasela
Hilltop Hoods
Rocket Science
Dakota Star
Bob Brozman
Downsyde
TZU
The New Pollutants
Butterfingers
The Panics
Hayden
Sarah Blasko
Even
The Cops
Betchadupa
The Spazzys
The Vasco Era
Carus and The True Believers
Epicure
Mia Dyson
Ash Grunwald
The Hot Lies
Clare Bowditch and the Feeding Set
The Roys

2005

Artists who performed at the 2005 event included:

The Dandy Warhols
Ozomatli
The Shins
Ian Brown
Wolfmother
Pete Murray
The Beautiful Girls
The Vasco Era
Faker
TZU
The Grates
Hoodoo Gurus
The Zutons
Sarah Blasko
End of Fashion
The White Buffalo
The Mess Hall
Evermore
Dallas Crane
Lior
Matt Walker and Ashley Davies
67 Special
Ugly Duckling
The Cat Empire
Rolling Blackouts
The Presets
Eric Bibb
Kelly Stoltz
Little Birdy
Ash Grunwald
Dappled Cities Fly
True Live
Offcutts
Katalyst and RuCL
Rob Sawyer
Mia Dyson
Youth Group
Dan Sultan & Scott Wilson
The Embers

In 2005 tickets for the Marion Bay festival sold out two and a half days after going on sale on 15 August, and Lorne tickets selling out one week after coming on sale.

Further allocations of tickets for both festivals were released during December and sold out within hours of coming on sale. An unlimited number of Falls Festival patrons were able to attend the 'Falls Cinema' on Thursday 29 December (one day earlier than the official kick-off) in an effort to minimize traffic congestion. In Tasmania, the number of tickets available were capped at 9000.

2006

In early July, a new website for the 2006 event was launched. People were able to subscribe to the official mailing list and be entered into the draw to be offered tickets ahead of the official release date of 16 August.  Subscribers that were selected were notified by 30 July.
Tickets for the 2006 festival were put on sale as of 9 am, 16 August. All tickets to the Lorne event were gone in about 2 hours. The Marion Bay event followed suit, with all tickets sold out within 3.5 hours.

The announced performers as of 28 December, include:

Modest Mouse
Michael Franti and Spearhead
Wolfmother
Basement Jaxx
The Bees
John Butler Trio
Saul Williams
The Black Seeds
Matt Costa
The Vasco Era
Dan Kelly and The Alpha Males
The Fumes
Dallas Frasca & Her Gentlemen
You Am I
The Audreys
Youth Group
Josh Pyke
Blue King Brown
Jamie Lidell
Hilltop Hoods
Eskimo Joe
Unleash the Nugget
Wolf & Cub
Dexter
Timmy Curran
Labjacd
Scribe
The Sleepy Jackson
The Mountain Goats
Little Birdy
The Exploders
Jen Cloher and The Endless Sea
Dan Sultan
Cansei de Ser Sexy
Ground Components
FourPlay String Quartet
Custom Kings
Muph & Plutonic
The Embers

Restrictions on ticket sales were made in 2006 (in the form of a ballot) in an attempt to curb the increasing practice of ticket resale, commonly known as 'scalping', as well as to make the access to tickets more equitable. The changes reflected similar alterations made to ticket sale procedures of other major Australian music festivals such as Splendour in the Grass and The Big Day Out. Previously, tickets had been released for sale in bulk and with no limit on the number of tickets able to be purchased by an individual, resulting in a high incidence of individuals purchasing multiple tickets, and a subsequent sell-out of tickets within 12 – 24 hours.

The restrictions included a purchasing limit of four tickets per any individual, as well as the initiation of an online ticket lottery, which randomly allocated the sale of approximately 50% of all tickets to a list of people who had registered their interest on the Festival's website. Tickets were also released on multiple dates rather than in bulk, to make sales more manageable and to increase consumer accessibility to the sale of tickets.

2007

The artists at the festival of 2007/08 included:

Kings of Leon
Groove Armada
Paul Kelly
Midnight Juggernauts
Black Rebel Motorcycle Club
The Waifs
Gotye
Built to Spill
José González
The Go! Team
Blackalicious
The Mess Hall
Girl Talk
Kev Carmody
Whiskey Go Go's
Neville Staple's Specials
Adam Cousens**
Bridget Pross**
Magic Dirt*
Sarah Blasko*
Children Collide*
Jackson Jackson*
The Pipettes
The Herd
Lior
Little Red
Operator Please
Old Man River
Angus and Julia Stone
The Beautiful Girls
Regurgitator
Clare Bowditch
Downhills Home*
Jeff Lang
Cut Off Your Hands
The Scientists of Modern Music
Diafrix
Mattafix
Busdriver
The Panics
Dirty Harry and the Rockets**
The Cops
Nathan Weldon and the Two Timers**
Special Patrol*
Dukes of Windsor*
Macromantics*
The Paper Scissors*
Dances With Voices*
Goons of Doom*
Whitley
La Fiesta Sound System*
Favela Rock DJs*
Tokyo Apartment Party DJs*
Thief Featuring DJ Gsan & Mugen with Paris Well*
Jennifer Tutty & Katie Drover
Hoops*
Funktrust DJs*
Uber Lingua DJs*
New Young Pony Club*

(* Lorne Only), (** Marion Bay only)

Ticket purchasing procedures changed again in 2007, extending changes made to procedures in 2006. Changes included:

the extension of the ticket lottery from 50% to 80% of all tickets – intended to increase the equity of ticket sale
the centralisation of all ticket sales to the Falls Festival Website – intended to eliminate the need to line up outside stores overnight to purchase a ticket, as well as prevent criminal problems associated with it such as littering and drinking in public
the inclusion of a name and date of birth printed on the Festival ticket – intended to further restrict scalping practices

Tickets went on sale to the general public on Monday 10 September at 9 am AEST, with the 14,500 tickets to the Lorne event selling out on the day they were released.

2008

Franz Ferdinand
The Hives
Santigold
The Kooks
Gomez
Tegan and Sara
Fleet Foxes
Donavon Frankenreiter
SoKo
Jamie Lidell
Cut Off Your Hands
Mystery Jets
Atmosphere feat. Brother Ali
A-Trak
Late of the Pier
Sharon Jones & The Dap-Kings
The Cat Empire
The Grates
Faker
Lykke Li
Augie March
Blue King Brown
Ash Grunwald
TZU
The Drones
Architecture in Helsinki
The Dodos
Wolf & Cub
Liam Finn
Rocket Science
Eli "Paperboy" Reed
British India
TinPan Orange
Labjacd
Violent Soho
South Rakkas Crew
Tame Impala
The Holidays*
Snob Scrilla*
Grafton Primary
Murs
CW Stoneking & The Primitive Orchestra
Laura Jean & The Eden Land Band
Mamadou Diabate
Kat Frankie
Barons of Tang
Dash & Will
Skipping Girl Vinegar

Those marked with an asterisk (*) played in Lorne only.

2009

Yeah Yeah Yeahs
Moby
Hilltop Hoods
Grizzly Bear
Rodrigo y Gabriela
The Temper Trap
Datarock
The Dirty Love^
Breakfast Balcony^
Jamie T
Amanda Blank*
Dappled Cities*
Wolfmother
Xavier Rudd
Emiliana Torrini
Little Birdy
Midnight Juggernauts
Andrew Bird
Lyrics Born
Chairlift
King Khan and the Shrines
Editors
Philadelphia Grand Jury
Kaki King
Sarah Blasko
Art vs. Science
DJ Yoda
Liam Finn
Lisa Mitchell
Major Lazer Soundsystem (DJ Set)
Patrick Watson
Seasick Steve
The View
Urthboy
White Rabbits
Future of the Left
Killaqueenz*
Yves Klein Blue
John Steel Singers
Bertie Blackman*
Washington*
The Inspector Cluzo*
Miami Horror*
Wagons*
Oh Mercy*
Jordie Lane*
Kid Sam*
The Beards*
Yacht Club DJs^
Little Red
The Phenomenal Handclap Band*
Fully Fitted*
The Vasco Era*
Dan Sultan*
Bag Raiders*
Grrilla Step*
Hoops DJ's*
Whitley*
Naysayer and Gilsun*
Catcall*
The Scare*
Zac Cooper^
The Paper Scissors*
Andy Murphy & Chardy*
Playing with Knives DJ's*

Funk’n’Soul Revue

Marva Whitney & The Transatlantics*
The Bamboos*
Deep Street Soul*
Mohair Slim
DJ Kano*
Emma Peel
Anna's Go-Go Academy
Russ Dewbury^
Chris Gill
Man Child

Those marked with an asterisk (*) played in Lorne only.

Those marked with a caret (^) played in Marion Bay only.

On 6 August 2009 some of the bands scheduled to play at the 2009 Falls Festival were leaked online due to a directory being left open on the official falls festival website. The organisers subsequently decided to officially release the entire first line-up announcement ahead of the scheduled 13 August release date.

On 7 October 2009 the Falls Festival announced that they would be putting on a pre-festival party, and extending the Falls Funk’n’Soul Revue to Lorne on 28 December. The extension of the revue made the Lorne festival a four-day event from 28 December to 1 January. The Funk’n’Soul Revue occurred over two days across the respective states, on the 28th in Lorne and on the 29th in Marion Bay with slightly differing lineups across the two locations.

2010

Interpol
Public Enemy (Performing their album Fear of a Black Planet in full)
Joan Jett and the Black Hearts
The Jezabels
The National
The Living End
Dan Kelly (musician)
Klaxons
Angus & Julia Stone
Tame Impala
The Rapture
Ladyhawke
Cold War Kids
Sleigh Bells
Chris Baio (Vampire Weekend)
Hot Hot Heat
Paul Kelly
Boy & Bear
Children Collide
The Beautiful Girls
The John Butler Trio
The Soft Pack
Last Dinosaurs
Dan Sultan*
Sally Seltmann*
The Cool Kids
Junip
Kitty, Daisy & Lewis
Marina & The Diamonds*
The Middle East
Cloud Control
Yacht Club DJs
Washington
The Public Opinion Afro Orchestra
The Morning Benders
The Bamboos
Tijuana Cartel (band)
A-Trak
Edan The Dee-Jay*
Ash Grunwald
Beardyman*
The Cuban Brothers*
World's End Press
Casiokids
Peaches
Daara J Family
Jamaica
Charlie Parr
Jonathan Boulet
Big Scary
Sampology
Eagle and the Worm
Jinja Safari
Tim & Jean

2011

Aloe Blacc
Alpine
An Horse
Arctic Monkeys
Arj Barker
Babylon Circus
Beirut
CANT
Crystal Castles
CSS
Dan Deacon
DJ Yoda
Easy Star All-Stars
Emma Louise
Fleet Foxes
Grouplove
J Mascis
John Butler Trio
Josh Pyke
Josh Thomas

Kimbra
Lanie Lane
Metronomy
Missy Higgins
Nouvelle Vague
Papa vs Pretty
PNAU
Regurgitator (Playing Unit in full)
The Scientists of Modern Music
Scratch Perverts
The Grates
The Head and the Heart
The Jezabels
The Jim Jones Revue
The Kooks
The Naked & Famous
Totally Enormous Extinct Dinosaurs (cancelled)
Unknown Mortal Orchestra
Young MC

Marion Bay Only
The Dirty Love
Lorne Only
360
Bass Kleph
Dr Don Don
Hook N Sling
Lotek
Mic Newman & Tornado Wallace
Nina Las Vegas
Oscar & Martin
Strange Talk
The Death Set
Bleeding Knees Club
The Bombay Royale
Miles Kane
Puta Madre Brothers
Clairy Browne & The Bangin' Rackettes
Boy in a Box
Dub FX
Guineafowl
Gyuto Monks of Tibet
Kim Churchill
Lewis Floyd Henry

2012

Angus Stone
Ash Grunwald
Ball Park Music
Beach House
Best Coast
Bombay Bicycle Club
Boy & Bear
Coolio
Cosmo Jarvis
Django Django
First Aid Kit
Hilltop Hoods
Hot Chip
Jinja Safari
Lisa Mitchell

Lyke Giants
Matt Corby
Maxïmo Park
Millions
Sampology Presents a Falls Anniversary Live AV Show
SBTRKT
Sharon Van Etten
The Flaming Lips
The Hives
The Vaccines
Totally Enormous Extinct Dinosaurs
Two Door Cinema Club
Willis Earl Beal

Lorne Only
Airwolf
Ajax
Alison Wonderland
Bleeding Knees Club
Cactus Channel
Cassian
Cub Scouts (Cub Sport)
Daniel Champagne
DZ Deathrays
Elizabeth Rose
Flume
Fraser A. Gorman
Grey Ghost
Howlin' Steam Train

Husky
Indian Summer
Jen Tutty & Katie Drover
King Gizzard & the Lizard Wizard
Miami Horror DJs
Parachute Youth
Peking Duk
Regular John
The Rechords
The Trouble With Templeton
Tinpan Orange
Soccer Mum DJs
World's End Press

2013

!!! (Chk Chk Chk)
Asta
Bombino
Bonobo
The Cat Empire
Chet Faker
Crystal Fighters
Cyril Hahn
Emma Louise
Flight Facilities
Gossling
Grizzly Bear
Hanni El Khatib
Hermitude
Horrorshow
James Vincent McMorrow
The John Steel Singers
Johnny Marr
London Grammar
MGMT
Neil Finn
Oliver Tank
The Paper Kites
POND
The Preatures
The Roots
The Rubens
Rufus
Solange
Thundamentals
Tom Odell
Vampire Weekend
Violent Femmes
Violent Soho
The War on Drugs
White Denim
The Wombats

2014

Airling^
Moses Gunn Collective^
KLP (musician)^*
Japanese Wallpaper*
Benson*
Just A Gent* 
Charlotte OC*
Grmm* 
Horns of Leroy*
Kilter*
Henry Stone (Comedian)*
Melbourne Gospel Choir*
Pierce Brothers*
Torren Foot*
Uv Boi بنفسجي فوق *
Yahtzel (DJ Set)*

Joining

alt-J
Art of Sleeping^*
Ásgeir
Big Freedia
The Black Lips
Bluejuice
Charlotte OC*
Cloud Control*^
Cold War Kids
Dan Sultan
DMA's
Fishing*^
Glass Animals
George Ezra
Jagwar Ma
Jamie xx
Joey Bada$$
John Butler Trio
Julian Casablancas + The Voidz
Kim Churchill
Kingswood *^
The Kite String Tangle
Megan Washington *^
Milky Chance
Movement
Northeast Party House *^
The Presets
Remi
Röyksopp & Robyn
Run The Jewels
Safia
SBTRKT (LIVE)
Spiderbait
Sticky Fingers
Thelma Plum *^
The Temper Trap
Tensnake
Tkay Maidza
Todd Terje (LIVE)
Tycho
Vance Joy
Wolf Alice

Those marked with a * played in Lorne only
Those marked with a ^ played in Byron Bay only

2015
In 2015 the events Lorne, Victoria venue was threatened by bushfires in the area and moved to Mount Duneed Estate, which is approximately 15 minutes from Geelong.

Alpine
Art vs Science
The Avener (FRA)
Birds of Tokyo
Bloc Party (UK)
BØRNS (USA)
Courtney Barnett
Disclosure (UK)
Django Django (UK)
El Vez (USA)
Fleetmac Wood (USA)
Foals (UK)
Gang of Youths
Gary Clark Jr. (USA)
Halsey (USA)
Hiatus Kaiyote
Hilltop Hoods
King Gizzard & the Lizard Wizard 
Kurt Vile and The Violators (USA)
Little May
The Maccabees (UK)
Mac DeMarco (CAN)
Meg Mac
Oh Wonder (UK)
Paul Kelly & Merri Soul Sessions ft. Clairy Browne, Dan Sultan, Kira Piru, Vika & Linda Bull
Rüfüs
Seth Sentry
Toro y Moi (USA)
Weird Al Yankovic (USA)
Young Fathers (UK)

+ more to be announced

2016

Childish Gambino (USA)
London Grammar (UK)
The Avalanches
Violent Soho
Matt Corby
Alison Wonderland 
Catfish and the Bottlemen (UK)
Fat Freddy's Drop (NZ)
Ta-Ku 
The Rubens 
The Jezabels
Ball Park Music
Grouplove (USA)
Bernard Fanning
Jamie T (UK)
Broods (NZ)
Tkay Maidza 
Grandmaster Flash (USA)
Illy
Golden Features
Hot Dub Time Machine
DMA's
AlunaGeorge (UK)
Booka Shade (GER)
Client Liaison
Vallis Alps
Parquet Courts (USA)
City Calm Down
L D R U
Modern Baseball (USA)
Tired Lion 
Remi 
Ry X
Marlon Williams (NZ)
Lemaitre (NOR)
Shura (UK)

 Grouplove cancelled their appearance at Falls Festival due to singer Hannah Hooper suffering from vocal problems

2017

Flume 
Fleet Foxes (USA)
The Kooks (UK)
Glass Animals (UK)
Peking Duk
Angus and Julia Stone 
Foster The People (USA)
Liam Gallagher (UK)
Vince Staples (USA)
Jungle (UK)
Dune Rats
The Smith Street Band
DRAM (USA)
Daryl Braithwaite 
Everything Everything (UK)
Allday
The Jungle Giants 
Thundamentals
Methyl Ethel
Slumberjack
D.D Dumbo
Anna Lunoe
DZ Deathrays
Confidence Man
Julia Jacklin
Bad//Dreems
Cosmo's Midnight
Winston Surfshirt
Luca Brasi
Alex Lahey
Camp Cope 
Flint Eastwood (USA)
Ecca Vandal
Dave (UK)
Total Giovanni

2018

Anderson Paak & The Free Nationals (USA)
Catfish and the Bottlemen (UK)
Vance Joy
Chvrches (UK)
Hilltop Hoods
Juice Wrld (USA)
Interpol (USA)
Toto (USA)
Dizzee Rascal (UK)
88 Rising ft. Rich Brian, Joji, Niki, & August 8 (USA/IDN/JPN)
Flight Facilities
Amy Shark
DMA's
King Gizzard & the Lizard Wizard
Golden Features
First Aid Kid (SWE)
Ocean Alley
Hockey Dad
Cashmere Cat (NOR)
The Vaccines (UK)
LPX (USA)
Cub Sport
Ruel
Jack River
Bishop Briggs (UK)
Mallrat
Briggs
Touch Sensitive
Tkay Maidza
Dermot Kennedy (IRL)
Tired Lion
Hobo Johnson & The LoveMakers (USA)
Soccer Mommy (USA)
Running Touch
Odette
Kinder
Mahalia (UK)
Hatchie
West Thebarton
Tia Gostelow
Kota Banks
Triple One
Alice Skye
Sweater Curse
Lex Deluxe

2019

 Halsey (USA)
 Vampire Weekend (USA)
 Disclosure (UK)
 Peking Duk
 Playboi Carti (USA)
 Of Monsters and Men (ISL)
 Pnau
 Lewis Capaldi (UK)
 Milky Chance (GER)
 John Farnham
 Banks (USA)
 Dope Lemon
 Vera Blue
 Yungblud (UK)
 G Flip
 Crooked Colours
 Parcels
 Thelma Plum
 #1 Dads
 Waax
 Baker Boy
 Psychedelic Porn Crumpets
 Amyl and the Sniffers
 The Japanese House (UK)
 Pink Sweats (USA)
 Good Dooogs
 Cxloe
 James Gillow
 Totty

2022

 Arctic Monkeys (UK)
 Lil Nas X (USA)
 Peggy Gou (KOR)
 Chvrches (UK)
 Jamie xx (UK)
 Aminé (USA)
 Ocean Alley
 CamelPhat (UK)
 Spacey Jane
 DMA's
 G Flip
 PinkPantheress (UK)
 Rico Nasty (USA)
 Amyl and the Sniffers
 Mall Grab
 Ben Böhmer (GER)
 DJ Seinfeld (SWE)
 Genesis Owusu
 TSHA (UK)
 CC:Disco
 Young Franco
 Anna Lunoe
 Luude
 Lastlings
 MAY-A
 Choomba
 The VANNS
 King Stingray
 Peach PRC
 Beddy Rays
 Jean Dawson (USA)
 Telenova
 Biscits (UK)
 Barry Can't Swim (UK)
 Elkka (UK)
 Floodlights
 Wongo
 YNG Martyr
 1300
 Moktar
 Magdalena Bay (USA)
 Dameeeela
 Ebony Boadu
 RONA.
 Elsy Wameyo
 Juno Mamba
 The Wiggles

 Jean Dawson was removed from the lineup for unknown reasons

References

External links
 

Rock festivals in Australia
Concert tours
Festivals in Victoria (Australia)
Festivals in Tasmania
Electronic music festivals in Australia
Music festivals established in 1993
Byron Bay, New South Wales
Festivals